The Zhdanov Doctrine (also called Zhdanovism or Zhdanovshchina) was a Soviet cultural doctrine developed by Central Committee secretary Andrei Zhdanov in 1946. It proposed that the world was divided into two camps: the "imperialistic", headed by the United States; and "democratic", headed by the Soviet Union. The main principle of the Zhdanov Doctrine was often summarized by the phrase "The only conflict that is possible in Soviet culture is the conflict between good and best". Zhdanovism soon became a Soviet cultural policy, meaning that Soviet artists, writers and intelligentsia in general had to conform to the party line in their creative works. Under this policy, artists who failed to comply with the government's wishes risked persecution. The policy remained in effect until the death of Joseph Stalin in 1953.

History

Parallel to Zhdanovism, "courts of honor" were introduced in the party apparatus. Taken from the Tsarist era, these courts were aimed at intensifying Russian patriotism through staged mock trials. The people indicted were not executed, but they paid with their careers. Leningrad party leader Alexey Kuznetsov explained in 1947 that these were designed to target educated individuals within the party. Due to doubts about servility to the West in the central apparatus, even the Central Committee and the MGB had courts. In the battle for spiritual and cultural "independence", Zhdanovism led to the purging of such characters as Solomon Mikhoels and the writers of the Jewish Anti-Fascist Committee. In 1950, with the "Leningrad affair", Kuznetsov himself was purged along with Deputy Premier Nikolai Voznesensky. Stalin himself had influence over the turn to more Tsarist policies, reinstating the "table of ranks" and revising the Soviet anthem. These policies were rolled back by Khrushchev when he came to power.    

Earlier some critics and literary historians were denounced for suggesting that Russian classics had been influenced by Jean-Jacques Rousseau, Molière, Lord Byron or Charles Dickens.  Part of Zhdanovism was a campaign against "cosmopolitanism", which meant that foreign models were not to be unthinkingly emulated, and native Russian accomplishments were emphasized.

A further decree on music was issued on 20 February 1948, "On Muradeli's Opera The Great Friendship" and marked the beginning of the so-called "anti-formalism campaign".  (The term "formalism" referred to art for art's sake which did not serve a larger social purpose.) Nominally aimed at Vano Muradeli's opera The Great Friendship, it signaled a sustained campaign of criticism and persecution against many of the Soviet Union's foremost composers, notably Dmitri Shostakovich, Sergei Prokofiev, Aram Khachaturian and Dmitri Klebanov for allegedly writing "hermetic" music and misusing dissonance. The decree was followed in April by a special congress of the Composers' Union, where many of those attacked were forced publicly to repent. The campaign was satirized in the Anti-Formalist Rayok by Shostakovich. The composers condemned were formally rehabilitated by a further decree issued on 28 May 1958.

In Wrocław, a congress met in mid-1948. Accompanying Soviet consolidation of power in Eastern Europe, Zhdanov's chosen man Fadeyev, president of the Soviet writer's union, made a speech establishing the base for socialist realism outside of the Soviet Union. This targeted three main groups - Soviet-leaning Western intellectuals that Zhdanov hoped would be brought around to Zhdanovism instead of just preaching peace, sympathetic non-Communist artists and intellectuals in liberal democracies, and artists and intellectuals in Eastern Europe and Soviet-occupied Germany who were to be forced to accept the tenets of Zhdanovism and socialist realism. This led to ripples in the West that led to more sympathies and pacifism in the West and benefited the SED in later East Germany.

See also
Socialist realism

References

Bibliography
Braudel, Fernand, 1993. A History of Civilizations, translated by Richard Mayne. New York: A. Lane, 1993. . Reprinted New York: Penguin Books, 1994. ;  (pbk).
Green, Jonathan, and Nicholas J. Karolides. 2005. The Encyclopedia of Censorship, rev. ed. New York: Facts On File. .
Taruskin, Richard, 2010. Music in the Late Twentieth Century. Oxford: Oxford University Press. .
Solomon.Maynard,1979. "Marxism and Art", Wayne State University Press. 

Soviet internal politics
Eastern Bloc
1946 in the Soviet Union
Soviet culture
Ideology of the Communist Party of the Soviet Union
Cold War history of the Soviet Union
Stalinism
1946 in international relations
1946 in politics
Political and cultural purges